Syntax is a peer-reviewed academic journal in the field of syntax of natural languages, established in 1998 and published by Wiley-Blackwell. Its current editors-in-chief are Suzanne Flynn (Massachusetts Institute of Technology) and Klaus Abels (University College London).The founding editors were Suzanne Flynn (MIT) and Samuel D. Epstein (University of Michigan).

Syntax was rated A in both the Australian Research Council's ERA journal list for 2010 and the European Science Foundation's linguistics journal list.

References 

Linguistics journals
Wiley-Blackwell academic journals
Publications established in 1998
Triannual journals
English-language journals
Syntax works